LUX* Resorts & Hotels is a major luxury hotel operator based in Mauritius which owns or part-owns many of its hotels and runs others under management contracts, which typically involve, in addition to management services, design, operations, sales and marketing. It is a wholly owned subsidiary of LUX* Hospitality Ltd., which is listed on the Stock Exchange of Mauritius and is an affiliate member of IBL, the country's 2nd largest conglomerate.

History
The company was founded in 1985 in Mauritius, by a group of Mauritian investors, as Naiade Resorts, with an emphasis on innovation, flexibility and a welcoming atmosphere. As well as gradually building up its own hotel operations, management contracts followed elsewhere in the Indian Ocean region.

In 2011, the group was rebranded as LUX* Resorts & Hotels and a new CEO brought in, Paul Jones, who had previously made a name for himself with the One&Only brand. The company now placed its emphasis on a less-staid approach to luxury introducing "real" coffee, retro-styled ice-cream parlours, on-the-beach film screenings, pop-up restaurants, red vintage telephone boxes and wellness & spa programmes.

Business model
Some one million tourists visit Mauritius every year, mainly coming from Europe, where the principal markets are France (including the neighbouring island of Reunion) and the United Kingdom. Marketing is also increasingly aimed at other European countries, as well as India and China.

Most LUX* properties are beachfront hotels. LUX* Belle Mare is located on the East Coast, LUX* Le Morne on the West Coast and LUX* Grand Gaube in the North. All three are rated five star although the government is currently thinking of introducing a revised system.

The group also runs LUX* Maldives, recently rated by readers of Condé Nast Traveller magazine as their number-one pick on the Indian Ocean Hot List, as well as LUX* Ile de La Reunion and LUX* Tea Horse Road Lijiang in China. There are plans to open five further boutique hotels along the Tea Horse Road in due course. LUX* is also moving into the Middle East, with a new hotel expected to open shortly in the United Arab Emirates, LUX* Al Zorah.

Other hotels managed by LUX* Resorts & Hotels include Tamassa in Bel Ombre on the South Coast of Mauritius, the Merville Beach just outside Grand Baie (Mauritius’ largest seaside village) and Le Recif in Reunion Island. It also has a private island, Ile des Deux Cocos, located close to the Blue Bay Marine Park.

LUX* has developed a franchise with its Café LUX* brand in May 2015, the first Café LUX* coffeehouse to open outside LUX* Resorts & Hotels, featuring LUX*’s own organic Island Blend, freshly roasted at LUX* Belle Mare. Café LUX* opened its first coffeehouse in the heart of the island, at La City Trianon. It also has a fractional ownership division, LUX* Villas, in UK.

Ownership 
As at June 2014, shareholding in the company's stock was as depicted in the table below:

External recognition awards

2014  
 Best Initiative in Human Resource for LUX* Etiquette & Moral Week, Worldwide Hospitality Awards 2014
 Best Resorts for Weddings and Honeymoons, Travel Agents Choice Awards (UK)
 Luxury Hotels and Resorts Operator of the Year, TTG Travel Awards (London)
 Gold Award for Services by COTRI (China Outbound Tourism Research Institute)
 Best Hotel Group of the Year, Mauritius Tourism Awards
 Best Luxury Spa Group (Indian Ocean region), World Luxury Spa Awards

2013 
Luxury Hotels and Resorts Operator of the year, TTG Travel Awards
Best Luxury Spa Group (Indian Ocean region), World Luxury Spa Awards

2012 
Best International Hotel Website, Best Hotel Website Africa and Best Hotel Website Mauritius, International Hospitality Awards
Luxury Travel Supplier of the Year, TTG Travel Awards (London)

See also
Economy of Mauritius
Tourism in Mauritius
List of Mauritian companies

References

Hospitality companies of Mauritius